"I Like It Like That" is a song written by Tony Pabon and Manny Rodriguez. It was initially a hit for boogaloo musician Pete Rodriguez in 1967, and was one of the most influential boogaloo songs of the era.  Rodriguez released an album in 1967 with the same title.

Background
Tony Pabon and Manny Rodriguez originally wrote "I Like It Like That" in 1967. Tony Pabon sang the vocals for the song, while the instrumentals were performed by Pete Rodriguez Orchestra. The recording was engineered by Fred Weinberg at National Recording Studios in New York City and produced by Roulette Records producer Morrie Pelsman, also known as Pancho Cristal, for Roulette Records. Part of the recording used many of the musician's kids chanting "Ahh Bibi!" which seemed to add to the excitement of the song. At the request of Pancho Cristal,  Weinberg delivered a copy to Roulette Records' owner, Morris Levy. According to Weinberg, "Levy wanted the kids that were singing on the song removed as they sounded out of tune", however, by that time a copy of the song was also delivered to a disk jockey named Symphony Sid at WEVD. Symphony Sid's show had a huge diverse audience. The record had hit the airwaves at WEVD and requests by listeners poured in. At the suggestion of Weinberg, Morris Levy left the kids singing in the recording.

The Blackout All-Stars version

The song was covered by Latin supergroup The Blackout All-Stars, under the title "I Like It", from volume 1 of the soundtrack to the 1994 film I Like It Like That.

The song was the group's only recording, as well as their only release to chart, peaking at #25 on the Billboard Hot 100 chart in the United States.

It was also used in the French movie Les Dalton when the Dalton brothers travel to Mexico to face a super machine gun to (El Tarlo) for removing the magic hat.

Background
The Blackout All-Stars was a one-off musical supergroup, consisting of various Latin music artists: Ray Barretto, Sheila E., Tito Puente, Tito Nieves, Paquito D'Rivera, Dave Valentin and Grover Washington Jr. The group was originally formed in 1994 to record the song "I Like It", the title song for the film I Like It Like That. Lead vocals were done by Nieves, while the rest of the group provided instrumentals or background vocals to the song. The song was later placed in volume 1 of the soundtrack to the film, and released as a single to promote the soundtrack. 12" and CD maxi singles were released, but the song failed to gain any popularity.

Resurgence in popularity
In 1996, roughly three years after the song's original release, Burger King used the song in a commercial promoting their "Have it your way" slogan. Following its inclusion in these commercials, a remixed version of the song started to pick up radio airplay. The song then started to climb the U.S. Billboard charts, peaking at #25 on the Billboard Hot 100 chart. The song's accompanying music video started to gain rotation on music video networks such as MTV and VH1. CD singles were also released. In 1997, Tito Nieves, the lead singer of the song, re-recorded the song on his album, I Like It Like That.

Aftermath of the group
The Blackout All-Stars remained one-off, despite the song's renewed popularity. Grover Washington Jr. died on December 17, 1999, of a heart attack. Tito Puente died of heart failure on May 31, 2000, as did Ray Barretto on February 17, 2006.

Critical reception
Jeremy Helligar of Entertainment Weekly gave the song a B, saying it was a "swinging number" and that "only a hopeless couch potato could possibly not like it."

Formats and track listings

12" 45 single (Columbia, 1994)
 "I Like It" (Reefa! extended mix) — 5:39
 "I Like It" (Reefa! 12" remix) — 6:56

12" single (Columbia, 1994)
A1 "I Like It" (D'Ambrosio club mix) – 7:03
A2 "I Like It" (D'Ambrosio dub mix) – 6:19
B1 "I Like It" (Flipsquad mix) – 4:51
B2 "I Like It" (Album mix) – 3:47

12" promo single (Columbia, 1994)
A1 "I Like It" (D'Ambrosio club mix) – 7:03
A2 "I Like It" (D'Ambrosio dub mix) – 6:19
B1 "I Like It" (Jason Nevins Turbo Beat remix) – 8:01
B2 "I Like It" ('97 Master Blaster) – 8:16

CD maxi single (Columbia, 1994)
 "I Like It" (Reefa! 7") – 3:28
 "I Like It" (Reefa! extended mix) – 5:39
 "I Like It" (Reefa! 12" remix) – 6:56
 "I Like It" (album version) – 3:48

CD single (Columbia, 1996)
 "I Like It" (edit) – 4:20
 "Joy/Reach/I'm Gonna Get You" (by Staxx of Joy/Robi Rob's Club World featuring Deborah Cooper/Bizarre Inc.)

Charts

Year-end charts

Sampling
In 2018, the song was sampled in the Billboard Hot 100 number-one song "I Like It" by Cardi B from her debut album Invasion of Privacy.

Use in pop culture 

 It is part of the soundtrack of the 2014 film Chef.
 It is part of the soundtrack (radio) in the video game Grand Theft Auto: Vice City Stories from the fictional in-game Latin music radio station "Radio Espantoso".
 It appeared on the soundtrack of Metro-Goldwyn-Mayer's 2019 computer-animated film The Addams Family.
 It was used by Odeon Cinemas in one of their bumpers in 2002.
 It was used in the opening scene of the 2022 film, Lyle, Lyle, Crocodile.

References

1967 songs
1994 singles
1996 singles
1997 singles
Tito Nieves songs
1967 debut singles
Song recordings produced by Sergio George
Columbia Records singles